The 1977 Colgate Red Raiders football team was an American football team that represented Colgate University as an independent during the 1977 NCAA Division I football season. In its second season under head coach Frederick Dunlap, the team compiled a 10–1 record. Mike Foley and Gary Hartwig were the team captains. 

The team played its home games at Andy Kerr Stadium in Hamilton, New York.

Schedule

Leading players 
Three trophies were awarded to the Red Raiders' most valuable players in 1977: 
 Two players received the Andy Kerr Trophy, awarded to the most valuable offensive player: Bob Relph, quarterback, and Henry White, running back.
 Gary Hartwig, defensive end, received the Hal W. Lahar Trophy, awarded to the most valuable defensive player.

Statistical leaders for the 1977 Red Raiders included: 
 Rushing: Henry White, 1,032 yards and 5 touchdowns on 131 attempts
 Passing: Bob Relph, 2,178 yards, 142 completions and 20 touchdowns on 241 attempts
 Receiving: Dick Slenker, 782 yards and 7 touchdowns on 44 receptions
 Total offense: Bob Relph, 2,405 yards (2,178 passing, 227 rushing)
 Scoring: Pat Healy, 74 points from 11 touchdowns and 4 two-point conversions
 All-purpose yards: Henry White, 1,877 yards (1,056 rushing, 448 kickoff returning, 306 receiving, 67 punt returning)
 Tackles: Doug Curtis, 116 total tackles
 Sacks: Gary Hartwig, 6 quarterback sacks

References

Colgate
Colgate Raiders football seasons
Colgate Red Raiders football